Gangwar may refer to:

 Gangwar (social group), a sub-caste native to northern India
 Bhagwat Saran Gangwar, Indian politician from Samajwadi Party
 Chetram Gangwar, Indian politician from Indian National Congress
 Harish Kumar Gangawar, Indian politician from Indian National Congress
 Kuldeep Singh Gangwar, Indian politician from Bahujan Samaj Party
 Parshuram Gangwar, Indian politician from Bharatiya Janata Party
 Santosh Gangwar, Indian politician from Bharatiya Janata Party
 Siyaram Gangwar, Indian politician from Indian National Congress
 Kesar Singh, Indian politician from Bhartiya Janta Party

See also 
 Gang war (disambiguation)